South African Wrestling Federation (SAWF) is the organization that governs amateur freestyle wrestling and Greco-Roman wrestling for men and women in South Africa. South African Wrestling Federation is affiliated to United World Wrestling (UWW) and is the national governing body of the sport. SAWF is also affiliated to SASCOC, and organizes national competitions such as the SAWF Presidents and Masters Championship.

Wrestlers

See also

 Sports in South Africa

References

External links
  
 United World Wrestling website

Wrestling
Wrestling in South Africa
National members of United World Wrestling